The 1941 Providence Friars football team was an American football team that represented Providence College as an independent during the 1941 college football season. In their fourth year under head coach Hugh Devore, the team compiled a 3–3–2 record.

Schedule

References

Providence
Providence Friars football seasons
Providence Friars football